Glavanovtsi may refer to:

 In Bulgaria (written in Cyrillic as Главановци):
 Glavanovtsi, Montana Province - a village in Georgi Damyanovo municipality, Montana Province
 Glavanovtsi, Pernik Province - a village in Tran municipality, Pernik Province